RFA Spaburn (A257) was a coastal Spa-class water carrier of the Royal Fleet Auxiliary.

References

Spa-class coastal water carriers
1946 ships